McComb is a village in Hancock County, Ohio, United States. The population was 1,648 at the time of the 2010 census. The village holds one school district, McComb Local School District and is the largest village in Hancock County.

History
McComb, originally known as Pleasantville, was laid out in 1847. The village was renamed McComb in 1858.

Despite its spelling, McComb is named for Alexander Macomb, who was the second man to serve as Commanding General of the United States Army. The reason for the spelling, "McComb" instead of "Macomb," is that the village was named by a Scotsman who fought under Macomb at the Battle of Plattsburg, and he used the Scottish manner of pronunciation and spelling.

William Bensinger and John Reed Porter among the first soldiers receive the Medal of Honor in American history for their role in the Great Locomotive Chase, are buried in McComb.

Geography
McComb is located at  (41.109134, -83.792191). The village is northwest of Findlay near the Putnam and Wood County borders.

Demographics

2010 census
As of the census of 2010, there were 1,648 people, 588 households, and 443 families residing in the village. The racial makeup of the village was 93.9% White, 0.4% African American, 0.4% Native American, 0.7% Asian, 2.1% from other races, and 2.4% from two or more races. Hispanic or Latino of any race were 8.9% of the population.

There were 588 households, of which 44.0% had children under the age of 18 living with them, 53.9% were married couples living together, 14.3% had a female householder with no husband present, 7.1% had a male householder with no wife present, and 24.7% were non-families. 19.9% of all households were made up of individuals, and 9.3% had someone living alone who was 65 years of age or older. The average household size was 2.80 and the average family size was 3.19.

The median age in the village was 34.8 years. 30.6% of residents were under the age of 18; 9.4% were between the ages of 18 and 24; 25% were from 25 to 44; 24.7% were from 45 to 64; and 10.4% were 65 years of age or older. The gender makeup of the village was 48.8% male and 51.2% female.

2000 census
As of the census of 2000, there were 1,676 people, 587 households, and 466 families residing in the village. The population density was 1,835.3 people per square mile (711.1/km2). There were 633 housing units at an average density of 693.2 per square mile (268.6/km2). The racial makeup of the village was 96.24% White, 0.24% African American, 0.12% Native American, 0.60% Asian, 0.89% from other races, and 1.91% from two or more races. Hispanic or Latino of any race were 3.58% of the population.

There were 587 households, out of which 44.8% had children under the age of 18 living with them, 60.5% were married couples living together, 14.1% had a female householder with no husband present, and 20.6% were non-families. 17.9% of all households were made up of individuals, and 6.6% had someone living alone who was 65 years of age or older. The average household size was 2.86 and the average family size was 3.19.

In the village, the population was spread out, with 33.9% under the age of 18, 6.7% from 18 to 24, 31.0% from 25 to 44, 19.6% from 45 to 64, and 8.8% who were 65 years of age or older. The median age was 31 years. For every 100 females there were 97.2 males. For every 100 females age 18 and over, there were 92.2 males.

The median income for a household in the village was $40,688, and the median income for a family was $43,333. Males had a median income of $31,189 versus $23,512 for females. The per capita income for the village was $17,043. About 7.6% of families and 8.6% of the population were below the poverty line, including 11.3% of those under age 18 and 7.7% of those age 65 or over.

Education
The McComb Local School system is a K-12 grade school. The schools in represented by its mascot the black panther with a colors of red and black. In total, the school has an enrollment number of 255 students.

Up until 2013, the main building in the village of McComb only housed K-5 and 9-12. The junior high school was located nearby in Hoytville, Ohio. In 2013, the school merged the main building with the junior high.

Places of interest
McComb Public Library has historical displays containing artifacts and information relating to the Civil War.

Churches in town include the Church of Christ, the Presbyterian Church, St. Johns Lutheran, and McComb United Methodist Church.

McComb houses a  Dollar General, gas station, Pisanello's Pizza, a park, and a dentist office.  McComb Union Cemetery features a small Civil War monument to remember McComb's Civil War heroes, including the graves of two of the first Medal of Honor recipients, who were involved in the Great Locomotive Chase.

Hearthside Food Solutions, formerly The Consolidated Biscuit Company (CBC,) has a factory located in McComb.  "The Cookie Factory", as it's better known to residents, manufactures cookies, crackers, and other edible items.  It is also the inspiration for the annual "Cookie Festival" in McComb.  The festival, which takes place in the beginning weekend of August, includes a parade, rides, games, food and cookies.

McComb also is home to PMP Joint Ambulance District, which provides emergency services to the village of McComb, both Pleasant and Portage township in Hancock County, and Jackson Township in Wood County.

McComb park features several shelter houses, a playground area, and two above ground reservoirs (one with boat access). The park also features a disc golf course. McComb reservoir 1 and 2 cover 26 acres and contain approximately 189 million gallons of fresh water (which is the second largest water supply in Hancock County).

References

External links
 Village website
 Public library
 McComb Local Schools

Villages in Hancock County, Ohio
Villages in Ohio